Mimoun El Oujdi was a Moroccan singer raï genre of music. Like other Maghrebi raï singers, he is habitually given the title "Cheb", meaning "young", and is usually known as Cheb Mimoun El Oujdi. He was born Mimoun Bakoush in Oujda in 1950, fifteen kilometres from the Algerian border. Mimoun El Oujdi released 18 albums between 1982 and 2012, including Barmān (1985), Alamāne (1995) and Soulouh (2008). He died in November 2018.

Releases
Album releases by Mimoun El Oujdi include the following, with year, approximate transliteration and original title:
 2010: Raqat al-basma
 2008: Soulouh
 2004: Ghorba bla wniss
 2000: Marjāna
 1997: Tnahad qalbi ki tfakart
 1996: Aadite ezinne
 1995: Alamāne
 1992: Az-zin wma darte fia
 1990: Alkay fat-talafun
 1988: Salwa al-maktāb
 1987: Ana bagheit habibi
 1986: Ya moul taksi
 1985: Barmān
 1984: Ash-shidda ma tdoum
 1984: Ana ma nawlish
 1984: Raha djaia mehnati
 1982: En-nar kedāt

References

1950 births
2018 deaths
Raï musicians
People from Oujda
21st-century Moroccan male singers
20th-century Moroccan male singers